Pema Tseden, also called Wanma Tsaidan (born December 1969), is a Tibetan film director and screenwriter of Chinese citizenship. He is a member of the China Film Directors' Guild, China Film Association and Chinese Film Literature Association.

Biography

Early life and education
Pema Tseden was born into a pastoral family, in Guide County, Qinghai, in December 1969, during the Cultural Revolution. He is the only one of three siblings to have finished school. He graduated from Northwest University for Nationalities, where he majored in Tibetan Language and Literature. After graduation, he worked as a primary school teacher and a civil servant. Then he pursued advanced studies at China's most prestigious film school, Beijing Film Academy, where he became the Academy's first-ever Tibetan student.

Career
Pema Tseden's debut work, The Silent Holy Stones, won the Best Directorial Debut at the 25th Golden Rooster Awards, Asian New Talent Award for Best Director at the 9th Shanghai International Film Festival, Special Jury Award at the 8th Changchun Film Festival, and Best First Feature at the 13th Beijing College Student Film Festival.

In 2009, Soul Searching won the Special Jury Award at the 12th Shanghai International Film Festival and was nominated for Golden Goblet Award.

Tharlo, a film adaptation based on the novel of the same name by himself, won the Best Adapted Screenplay at the 52nd Golden Horse Film Festival and Awards, it also prizes in the 23rd Beijing College Student Film Festival, and the film was nominated for Golden Lion at the 72nd Venice International Film Festival.

Two colleagues reported that Pema Tseden had been detained at Qinghai airport by police in late June 2016 and was hospitalised after having been subjected to all-night interrogation.

Filmography

Film

Bibliography
Enticement: Stories of Tibet, translated by Patricia Schiaffini-Vedani and Michael Monhart, Albany, NY: State University of New York Press

Awards

References

External links

 
The Doctor, by Pema Tseden.
  Thomas Sotinel, Au milieu d'une avalanche de tragédies, deux films illuminent Locarno, Le Monde, 16 août 2009
  Tenzing Sonam, Une tempête tranquille: Pema Tseden et l'émergence du cinéma tibétain, Monde chinois n° 31 (Automne 2012) Tibet : créer pour résister
 The Search

1969 births
People from Hainan Prefecture
Living people
Northwest University for Nationalities alumni
Beijing Film Academy alumni
Film directors from Qinghai
Screenwriters from Qinghai